The HAPO Columbia Cup is an H1 Unlimited hydroplane boat race held each July on the Columbia River in Columbia Park, Tri-Cities, Washington. The race is the main attraction of the annual Water Follies festivities. With the exception of 2020, Tri-Cities has hosted a race consecutively since 1966.

History

The Columbia River towns of Kennewick, Pasco, and Richland first climbed on the Unlimited bandwagon in 1966 with the first annual Tri-Cities Atomic Cup. There had been talk of inviting the Unlimiteds there as early as 1958. But 1966 was when it finally happened. Bill Brow was the winner that first year, driving Bernie Little's Miss Budweiser.

Driver Dave Villwock and the Miss Elam Plus team won the 2006 Columbia Cup under extraordinary circumstances. Their boat "blew over" during the running of preliminary Heat 2-A. They rebounded in time to win the next two heats and the overall championship.

After the race at Detroit, the home of the annual Gold Cup race, was originally cancelled in 2015, the Gold Cup was moved to the Tri-Cities race, renaming the race to the Gold Cup for that year. When the Detroit race came back at the end of 2015 and into 2016, the Gold Cup returned to the city, and the Tri-Cities race returned to the "Columbia Cup" again.

The race is run on a 2.5 mile oval course located in an area on the Columbia River referred to as the "McNary Pool."

List of Tri-Cities Unlimited Hydroplane Champions

References

External links
Columbia Cup website
H1 Unlimited website

H1 Unlimited
Racing motorboats
Hydroplanes
Motorboat racing
Recurring sporting events established in 1966
1966 establishments in Washington (state)
Sports in Washington (state)